The 1941–42 AHL season was the sixth season of the American Hockey League. Ten teams played 56 games each in the schedule. The Indianapolis Capitals won the F. G. "Teddy" Oke Trophy as the Western Division champions, and the Calder Cup as league champions.

Team changes
The Philadelphia Ramblers are renamed the Philadelphia Rockets.
 The Washington Lions join the AHL as an expansion team, based in Washington, D.C., playing in the East Division.

Final standings
Note: GP = Games played; W = Wins; L = Losses; T = Ties; GF = Goals for; GA = Goals against; Pts = Points;

Scoring leaders

Note: GP = Games played; G = Goals; A = Assists; Pts = Points; PIM = Penalty minutes

 complete list

Calder Cup playoffs

All Star Classic
The first AHL All-Star game was played on February 3, 1942, at the Cleveland Arena in Cleveland, Ohio. The East division All-Stars defeated the West division All-Stars 5–4.

See also
List of AHL seasons

References
AHL official site
AHL Hall of Fame
HockeyDB

American Hockey League seasons
2